Victoria P. Kornfield is an American schoolteacher and politician from Maine. A Democrat from Bangor, Kornfield represented District 125 of the Maine House of Representatives, which encompassed part of Bangor of Penobscot County. First elected in 2012, Kornfield was re-elected in 2014, 2016, and 2018. She lost a tightly contested primary for the Bangor-area Maine Senate district in July 2018 to Joe Baldacci.

Kornfield worked as an English teacher in the Bangor School Department.

References

Year of birth missing (living people)
Living people
Politicians from Bangor, Maine
Women state legislators in Maine
Democratic Party members of the Maine House of Representatives
Schoolteachers from Maine
American women educators
21st-century American politicians
21st-century American women politicians